George Purnell Gunn (October 11, 1903 – June 16, 1973) was an American prelate who served as the fifth Episcopal Bishop of Southern Virginia between 1950 and 1971.

Early life and education
Gunn was born on October 11, 1903, in Winona, Mississippi, the son of Rev. Elijah Sterling Gunn and Susan Ellwood Carter. Based on his parents' ancestry, Gunn later became active with the First Families of Virginia. Raised in Halifax County, Virginia, young George attended to the Virginia Episcopal School in Lynchburg between 1921 and 1923. In 1924 he went to Charlottesville for studies at the University of Virginia, graduating with a Bachelor of Arts in 1927. He then traveled to Alexandria to study for the ministry at the Virginia Theological Seminary, graduating in 1930. The same institution awarded him a Doctor of Divinity in 1948. He married Frances Hawkins Purnell on September 3, 1930, and together had three children.

Ministry
Bishop Robert Carter Jett of the Episcopal Diocese of Southwestern Virginia ordained Gunn as a deacon in October 1929 and priest in June 1930. He then became rector of Moore Parish in Altavista Campbell County, Virginia, and in 1932 became rector of the Church of the Good Shepherd in Norfolk, Virginia, where he remained till 1948.

Bishop
Gunn was elected Coadjutor Bishop of Southern Virginia on September 17, 1947, during a diocesan special convention. He was consecrated on January 6, 1948, by Presiding Bishop Henry Knox Sherrill. He then succeeded as diocesan bishop on January 6, 1950, upon the retirement of Bishop Brown that same day. He retained the post till his retirement in 1971. He died in Norfolk, Virginia on June 16, 1973.

References

1973 deaths
1903 births
People from Winona, Mississippi
People from Halifax County, Virginia
University of Virginia alumni
Virginia Theological Seminary alumni
20th-century American Episcopalians
Episcopal bishops of Southern Virginia
20th-century American clergy